Theophilus R. Eagles Jr. (November 10, 1885 – June 7, 1936) was an American college football coach and collegiate mathematics faculty member. He served as the head football coach at Catawba College in Salisbury, North Carolina in 1908, compiling a record of 0–4. Eagles was also as a mathematics professor at the school. Later in his academic career, he was a math professor at Bethany College in Bethany, West Virginia.

References

External links
 

1885 births
1936 deaths
Barton College alumni
Bethany College (West Virginia) faculty
Catawba College faculty
Catawba Indians football coaches
University of North Carolina at Chapel Hill alumni
People from Wilson County, North Carolina